is a passenger railway station  located in the city of Odawara, Kanagawa Prefecture, Japan, operated by the  East Japan Railway Company (JR East).

Lines
Hayakawa Station is served by the Tōkaidō Main Line, and is located 86.0 kilometers from the line’s terminus at Tokyo Station.

Station layout
The station consists of a single island platform, connected to the station building by a footbridge. The platform is too short to accommodate trains longer than 15 cars in length, so a door cut system is employed.The station is attended.

Platforms

Station history
Hayakawa Station first opened on December 21, 1922, when the section of the Atami-Odawara Line connecting Odawara with Manazuru was completed. From December 1, 1934 this became the Tōkaidō Main Line. Regularly scheduled freight services were discontinued in 1959, and parcel services by 1972. With the dissolution and privatization of the JNR on April 1, 1987, the station came under the control of the East Japan Railway Company. Automated turnstiles using the Suica IC Card system came into operation from November 18, 2001. The “Midori no Madoguchi” service counter was discontinued from 2007.

Passenger statistics
In fiscal 2019, the station was used by an average of 1386 passengers daily.

The passenger figures (boarding passengers only) for previous years are as shown below.

Surrounding area

Odawara City Hall Hayakawa Branch office
Odawara fishing port
Hayakawa Post Office

See also
List of railway stations in Japan

References
Yoshikawa, Fumio. Tokaido-sen 130-nen no ayumi. Grand-Prix Publishing (2002) .

External links
Official home page.

Notes

Railway stations in Kanagawa Prefecture
Railway stations in Japan opened in 1922
Railway stations in Odawara